Deir El Aachayer is a village north of Rashaya, in the Rashaya District and south of the Beqaa Governorate in Lebanon.

The municipality is located on the border frontier of the Kaza of Rashaya, one of eight mohafazats (governorates). The registered population of the village is around 500, predominantly Druze. Actual residents may number only around 250, distributed among about 90 households. The village has a municipal council made up of nine members, and a town mayor. Residents rely on farming as a main source of income, especially grapes, fruit and wheat. Residents also raise and herd sheep and cows, which have been a good source of milk. Farmers in the village have had difficulty selling their products in modern times.

Deir El Aachayer has a number of local springs, including Ain Halalweh, Ain Shayeb, Ain Rouk, Ain Dibb. The village was once known by the name Deir Mar Sema’an, owing to the Monastery of Saint Simon, known locally as Al Borj, said to have been built by the Romans for preaching, religious ceremonies and practices by disciples of Saint Simon the Baptist. The monastery having been a stronghold for the students, enabling them to expand their teaching in Syria.

Roman temple
A Greek inscription was found noting that a bench was installed "in the year 242, under Beeliabos, also called Diototos, son of Abedanos, high priest of the gods of Kiboreia". Julien Alquot argued that the bench had liturgical uses as a mobile throne. The era of the gods of Kiboreia is not certain, as is their location, which is not conclusively to be identified with Deir El Aachayer, but was possibly the Roman sanctuary or the name of a settlement in the area. It has been suggested that the name Kiboreia was formed from the Aramaic word kbr, meaning a "place of great abundance".

References

Bibliography

  (pp. 497-498)

External links

 Megalithic Portal Entry about Roman Temple in Deir El Achayer
 Discover Lebanon Map Source for Deir El Aachayer
 Republic of Lebanon Government Portal for Information and Forms
Deir El Aachayer, Localiban

Populated places in Rashaya District
Druze communities in Lebanon

Archaeological sites in Lebanon
Ancient Roman temples